The Falkland Islands has competed in nine editions of the Commonwealth Games. Their first appearance was in 1982, just months after the Falklands War.

History 
The Glasgow 2014 Games saw the Falkland Islands send 23 competitors in three disciplines: Badminton, Lawn Bowls and Shooting.  To date, the Falkland Islands has not won any medals.

Louis Baillon is the only Falkland Islander to have become an Olympic champion, as a member of the British field hockey team which won a gold medal in 1908.

See also
 1982 Commonwealth Games opening ceremony

References

 
Nations at the Commonwealth Games